The 2019 Pacific typhoon season was the costliest Pacific typhoon season on record, just ahead of the previous year. The season featured fairly above-average tropical cyclone activity for the second consecutive year, producing 29 named storms, 17 typhoons, and five super typhoons. The season's first named storm, Pabuk, reached tropical storm status on January 1, becoming the earliest-forming tropical storm of the western Pacific Ocean on record, breaking the previous record that was held by Typhoon Alice in 1979. The season's first typhoon, Wutip, reached typhoon status on February 20. Wutip further intensified into a super typhoon on February 23, becoming the strongest February typhoon on record, and the strongest tropical cyclone recorded in February in the Northern Hemisphere. The season's last named storm, Phanfone, dissipated on December 29 after it made landfall in the Philippines. The accumulated cyclone energy (ACE) index of this season amounted to 269 units.

The scope of this article is limited to the Pacific Ocean to the north of the equator between 100°E and 180th meridian. Within the northwestern Pacific Ocean, two separate agencies assign names to tropical cyclones which can often result in a cyclone having two names. The Japan Meteorological Agency (JMA) will name a tropical cyclone should it be judged to have 10-minute sustained wind speeds of at least  anywhere in the basin, while the Philippine Atmospheric, Geophysical and Astronomical Services Administration (PAGASA) assigns names to tropical cyclones which move into or form as a tropical depression in their area of responsibility located between 135°E–115°E and between 5°N–25°N regardless of whether or not a tropical cyclone has already been given a name by the JMA. Tropical depressions that are monitored by the United States' Joint Typhoon Warning Center (JTWC) are given a number with a "W" suffix.



Seasonal forecasts

During the year, several national meteorological services and scientific agencies forecast how many tropical cyclones, tropical storms, and typhoons will form during a season and/or how many tropical cyclones will affect a particular country. These agencies included the Tropical Storm Risk (TSR) Consortium of University College London, PAGASA and Taiwan's Central Weather Bureau. The first forecast of the year was released by PAGASA on February 7, within its seasonal climate outlook for the period January–June. The outlook noted that one to two tropical cyclones were expected between January and March, while two to four were expected to develop or enter the Philippine Area of Responsibility between April and June. Moreover, PAGASA predicts an 80% chance of a weak El Niño presence during February–March–April period. On May 7, the TSR issued their first forecast for the season, predicting that the 2019 season would be a slightly above average season, producing 27 named storms, 17 typhoons, and ten intense typhoons. One of the factors behind this is due to the possible development of a moderate El Niño anticipated within the third quarter of the year.

On July 5, the TSR released their second forecast for the season, now lowering their numbers and predicting that the season would be a below-average season with 25 named storms, 15 typhoons, and eight intense typhoons. The PAGASA issued their second forecast for the season on July 15, predicting six to nine tropical cyclones expected to develop or enter their area between July and September and about three to five tropical cyclones by September to December. The agency also predicted that the weak El Niño was expected to weaken towards neutral conditions by August and September 2019. On August 7, the TSR released their final forecast for the season, predicting a near-normal season with 26 named storms, 16 typhoons and eight intense typhoons.

Season summary

 The next named storm, Typhoon Wutip, strengthened into a Category 5-equivalent super typhoon and became the most powerful February typhoon on record, surpassing Typhoon Higos in 2015.  The month of June was unusually quiet with the next named storm, Sepat, only peaking as a tropical storm, affected mainland Japan bringing gusty winds and a tornado. Tropical Storm Sepat, however, was only classified as a subtropical storm by the JTWC.

 Lekima brought total damages of $9.28 billion, making it the fifth costliest typhoon and the costliest typhoon in China.

Systems

Tropical Storm Pabuk

A tropical disturbance formed over the southern portion of the South China Sea on December 28, 2018, which absorbed the remnants of Tropical Depression 35W (Usman) on December 30. Under high vertical wind shear, the low-pressure area remained disorganized until December 31 when it was upgraded to a tropical depression by both the JMA and the JTWC. As it was designated 36W by the JTWC, it was unofficially the last system of the 2018 typhoon season. At around 06:00 UTC on January 1, 2019, the system was upgraded to the first tropical storm of the 2019 typhoon season and named Pabuk by the JMA, surpassing Typhoon Alice in 1979 to become the earliest-forming tropical storm of the northwest Pacific Ocean on record.

Under marginal conditions including warm sea surface temperatures, excellent poleward outflow but strong vertical wind shear, Pabuk struggled to intensify further for over two days until it accelerated west-northwestward and entered the Gulf of Thailand on January 3, where vertical wind shear was slightly weaker. It became the first tropical storm over the gulf since Muifa in 2004. Moreover, it tried to form an eye revealed by microwave imagery. On January 4, the Thai Meteorological Department reported that Pabuk had made landfall over Pak Phanang, Nakhon Si Thammarat at 12:45 ICT (05:45 UTC), although other agencies indicated a landfall at peak intensity between 06:00 and 12:00 UTC. Pabuk became the first tropical storm to make landfall over southern Thailand since Linda in 1997. Shortly after 12:00 UTC, the JMA issued the last full advisory for Pabuk as it exited the basin into the North Indian Ocean.

In Vietnam, Pabuk caused one death, and the losses were estimated at ₫27.87 billion (US$1.2 million). Eight people in Thailand were killed, and the losses in the country were estimated to be 5 billion bahts (US$157.2 million). Pabuk also killed one person in Malaysia.

Tropical Depression 01W (Amang)

The JTWC upgraded a disturbance north of Bairiki to a tropical depression with the designation 01W late on January 4 and expected some intensification, but it failed to develop and the JTWC downgraded it back to a disturbance on January 6. The system continued drifting westwards for two weeks without development. The tropical depression entered the Philippine Area of Responsibility, being given the name Amang by PAGASA. Amang moved west-northwestward until it made landfall over Siargao at 11:00 Philippine Standard Time (PST), January 20. Amang changed course after the landfall, turning northward the next day until weakening over Samar the same day. Amang then weakened into a low pressure area before dissipating shortly afterwards, which then PAGASA issued their final advisories.

The depression indirectly triggered landslides and flash floods in Davao Oriental and Agusan del Norte, killing 10 people. Damage in Davao were at ₱318.99 million (US$6.04 million).

Typhoon Wutip (Betty)

A low-pressure area formed just south of the Marshall Islands on February 16. It then began to gradually organize while moving westward, just south of Federated States of Micronesia. This made Wutip the first Category 5-equivalent super typhoon recorded in the month of February. . 

Preliminary estimates of damage in Guam and Micronesia were at $3.3 million.

Tropical Depression 03W (Chedeng)

 At 5:30 PST on March 19, Chedeng made landfall on Malita, Davao Occidental. 

Infrastructural damage in Davao Region were at Php1.2 million (US$23,000).

Tropical Storm Sepat (Dodong)

On June 24, the JMA began monitoring on a tropical depression that had formed well to the east of Luzon from the remnants of a separate system. On June 25, the system began curving towards the northeast; the PAGASA also began to issue warnings on the formative disturbance. Rounding the periphery of a subtropical ridge of high pressure, the depression tracked towards the east-northeast through the East China Sea, intensifying some as it encountered an area of high sea surface temperatures and low wind shear. On June 26, the cyclone left the PAGASA's area of responsibility. Curved banding developed later that day as the center passed east of Okinawa. Tracing the northwestern periphery of the ridge, the system curved towards the east-northeast, paralleling the southern coast of the main Japanese islands. Supported by favorable sea surface temperatures and outflow, the system was upgraded to a tropical storm at 09:00 UTC on June 27, gaining the name Sepat. A peak intensity with  10-minute sustained winds was attained later that day while Sepat began to acquire extratropical characteristics.

Some ferry routes and bullet trains were suspended as the storm passed near Tokyo on June 28, dropping heavy rainfall. Evacuations were advised for most districts in Kagoshima due to an increased risk of landslides. In Hioki, Kagoshima,  of rain fell in a six-hour period on the morning of June 28;  fell in Kamikatsu, Tokushima, in a 24-hour period. An EF0 tornado damaged 17 structures in Gifu and Ginan.

Tropical Depression 04W (Egay)

Tropical Storm Mun

 Between 4:30–5:00 a.m. ICT on July 4 (21:30–22:00 UTC on July 3), Mun made landfall in Thái Bình Province in northern Vietnam. 

A bridge in Tĩnh Gia District was damaged by the storm, which killed 2 people and left 3 injured. Damage of an electric pole in Trấn Yên District were at ₫5.6 billion (US$240,000).

Tropical Storm Danas (Falcon)

In Philippines, four people were killed after Danas triggered flooding in the country. Agricultural damage in Negros Occidental were calculated at ₱19 million (US$372,000), while agricultural damage in Lanao Norte reached ₱277.8 million (US$5.44 million). Danas caused stormy weather across South Korea; however, its effects were relatively minor. A man died after being swept away by strong waves in Geochang County. Damage in South Jeolla Province were at W395 million (US$336,000), while damage in Jeju Island up to W322 million (US$274,000). Additionally, Danas also triggered flash flooding in Kyushu. An 11-year-old boy was killed.

Tropical Depression Goring

 However, the storm made landfall on Taiwan soon afterward and weakened; as a result, the JTWC cancelled the TCFA and has lowered Goring's chance for development to 'medium'.

Tropical Storm Nari

Tropical Storm Wipha

In Vietnam, at least 27 people were killed. Thanh Hóa Province was the worst hit province within the nation, with 16 deaths alone, and the losses were amounted to 1 trillion đồng (US$43.1 million). Damage in Sơn La Province reached 28 billion đồng (US$1.21 million). Damage in Hainan and Guangxi valued at ¥83.6 million (US$12 million).

Typhoon Francisco

In anticipation of coastal flooding, 20,020 people were evacuated from Kokuraminami-ku and Moji-ku. Transportation in the affected region was disrupted, with 130 flights cancelled and the Kyushu Railway Company suspending train service. Striking Kyushu as a typhoon, Francisco brought heavy rain and strong winds to much of the island. One person drowned in a flooded river in Kokonoe. Two people suffered injury after being knocked over by strong winds.

Typhoon Lekima (Hanna)

 Soon afterward, Lekima started to undergo an extratropical transition, with the JTWC discontinuing advisories on the storm. The remnants of Lekima made their way to the Korean Peninsula as an extratropical storm.

Though Lekima, known as Hanna in the Philippines, did not directly affect the Philippines, the storm enhanced the southwest monsoon, which caused heavy rain in the nation. Three boats sank in Guimaras Strait; 31 people died and three were missing.

Typhoon Krosa

Wind gusts reached  in Muroto. Rough seas produced by the storm killed two people while flooding killed one other. Fifty-five people were injured in various incidents. Damage in Japan amounted to be ¥2.177 billion (US$20.5 million).

Severe Tropical Storm Bailu (Ineng)

 At 13:00 TST (05:00 UTC) on August 24, Bailu made landfall over Manzhou Township, Pingtung County, Taiwan. 

Though Bailu did not made landfall in the Philippines, two people were killed and state of calamity was declared in Ilocos Norte due to flooding, and left Php1.1 billion (US$21 million) damage in the province. Bailu also killed one person, and injured nine others in Taiwan. Institutional damage were calculated to be TWD 2.31 million (US$74,000), while agricultural damage reached TWD 175 million (US$5.63 million). Damage in Fujian reached ¥10.49 million (US$1.5 million).

Tropical Storm Podul (Jenny)

 Podul made landfall in Casiguran, Aurora at 10:40 p.m. PST (14:40 UTC). 

In the Philippines, Podul left 2 dead and a damage of ₱240 million (US$4.59 million). Podul triggered tornado in Hainan, which killed eight people and left two others injured. Damage of this tornado reached ¥16.22 million (US$2.27 million). In Vietnam, the storm left six dead and two missing. Losses in Sơn La Province exceeds 1.8 billion đồng (US$77,000).

Tropical Storm Kajiki (Kabayan)

 It passed through the Batanes Islands, and PAGASA upgraded the system to a tropical depression, naming it Kabayan; however, the system exited their area of responsibility shortly thereafter. In the same time the Joint Typhoon Warning Center issued a Tropical Cyclone Formation Alert (TCFA) for Kabayan. 

Because of the slow movement over Vietnam, Kajiki brought heavy rains and triggered flooding. Rainfall were recorded to as high as 530 mm within the regions. The storm killed ten people and nine others remained missing. Agricultural losses were estimated to be ₫300 billion (US$76.2 million).

Typhoon Lingling (Liwayway)

On August 31, three tropical depressions formed, one of which was east of Mindanao. The Joint Typhoon Warning Center then issued a Tropical Cyclone Formation Alert for the system. On September 1, the Philippines agency PAGASA upgraded the system and named it Liwayway. At 2:30 p.m.

Passing east of the Philippines, Lingling caused flooding in Luzon. Agricultural damage in Pampanga were amounted to ₱5.65 million (US$108,000). Economic loss in Okinawa Prefecture were at JP¥533 million (US$4.98 million). Passing west of South Korea, Lingling killed three people and injured ten others. Wind gusts reached  in Heuksando, the strongest wind observed in the country since Maemi in 2003. About 161,000 households had experienced power outages. Damage nationwide were amounted to ₩28.76 billion (US$24.1 million). In North Korea, five people were dead with three others injured. Lingling also passed through the Northeast China, damage were calculated at CN¥930 million (US$131 million). Moreover, Lingling's extratropical remnants caused flooding in the Russian Far East, with damage in the Jewish Autonomous Oblast amounting to ₽2 billion (US$30.4 million).

Typhoon Faxai

 Faxai weakened slightly before making landfall in Chiba City shortly before 5:00 a.m. JST September 9.

 Trains service in JR East were cancelled due to the storm. Two people died from heatstroke because of the power outage. Damage in Japan reached US$10 billion.

The name Faxai was retired and was replaced with Nongfa.

Tropical Depression Marilyn

Later that day, JMA cancelled the gale warning. By the next day, the JTWC issued a Tropical Cyclone Formation Alert on the system, which will later cancel the next day. 

High surf from Tropical Depression Marilyn in Puerto Princesa capsized 6 boats at sea.

Tropical Storm Peipah

Typhoon Tapah (Nimfa)

 PAGASA later named the tropical cyclone as "Nimfa", as the JTWC issued a medium warning for Nimfa.  A non-warning tropical depression in the South China Sea merged with the circulation of Tapah on Thursday, September 19. 

During the passage of Tapah, three people were killed in Japan, and the agricultural damage were amounted to be ¥583 million (US$5.42 million). Damage in South Korea were at ₩2.96 billion (US$2.48 million). Though three deaths were reported during the storm, officials said that they were not related to Tapah.

Typhoon Mitag (Onyok)

 The PAGASA named the system "Onyok" as it entered the Philippine Area of Responsibility, 

In Taiwan, 12 people were injured during the typhoon. The Nanfang'ao Bridge collapsed following the passage of Mitag, leaving six dead and 12 injured; the specific cause of the collapse is still being investigated. Agricultural damage in Yaeyama Islands were at JP¥84.41 million (US$781,000). In Zhoushan, three people were killed, and the economic loss reached CN¥1.856 billion (US$260 million). Mitag also killed 13 people and left 2 missing in South Korea. Damage nationwide were amounted to be ₩181.9 billion (US$151 million).

Typhoon Hagibis

 The National Weather Service also began issuing advisories for its areas of responsibility, with a typhoon warning issued for Saipan and Tinian, and tropical storm advisories issued for Sinapalo and Hagåtña.

After passing the Mariana Islands, Hagibis began an eyewall replacement cycle, which caused the rapid intensification phase to end. As the primary eyewall began to erode, the JTWC downgraded the system slightly to a high-end Category 4 system at 00:00 UTC on October 8. Several hours later, Hagibis re-intensified into a Category 5 equivalent system upon completing the eyewall replacement cycle. Hagibis began to weaken on October 10. Hagibis made landfall on the Izu Peninsula of southeastern Honshu just after 09:00 UTC on October 12.

By 13:30 UTC on October 10, the expected impacts in parts of Japan were such that the organisers of the 2019 Rugby World Cup decided to cancel at least two matches scheduled to be played over the weekend. On October 12 a third match was cancelled Japan Rail, Japan Airlines, and All Nippon Airways all announced suspended services.

On October 11, Formula One announced that they are cancelling all Saturday planned events that were initially scheduled as part of the 2019 Japanese Grand Prix. This includes the third practice session and qualifying, the latter of which was rescheduled to take place on Sunday morning, a few hours before the race. The F4 Japanese Championship had previously announced the previous day that they will be cancelling the double header round at Suzuka that was initially scheduled to take place as a supporting event for the Japanese Grand Prix.

The name Hagibis was retired and was replaced with Ragasa.

Typhoon Neoguri (Perla)

On October 15, a tropical depression formed in the West Pacific. The depression slowly intensified and was eventually given the name Perla by PAGASA. The depression strengthened into Tropical Storm Neoguri, late on October 17. By 12:00 UTC on October 19, Neoguri became a typhoon as it neared the Ryukyu Islands of Japan. Just 5 hours later, Neoguri reached its peak intensity as it began to pull to the northeast. Neoguri began to quickly weaken and made a transition into an extratropical cyclone to the south of Japan on October 21.

As Neoguri strengthened, it brought light rainstorms to the Batanes and Cagayan in the Philippines. As Neoguri brushed Japan, it dumped up to 9 inches of rainfall in the Tokyo Metro Area, which had already been drenched by Typhoon Hagibis earlier that month and Typhoon Faxai the month before.

Typhoon Bualoi

On October 17, the Joint Typhoon Warning Center began monitoring a disturbance situated a couple hundred miles east of the Marshall Islands, and on October 19, the disturbance quickly organised into Tropical Depression 22W. Advisories began to be issued on the system as a conducive environment with very warm sea surface temperatures and low wind shear allowed 22W to strengthen. By October 19, it became Tropical Storm Bualoi and on the next day, it entered a period of rapid intensification. Bualoi quickly became a severe tropical storm and then a typhoon soon afterwards. The rate of strengthening slowed until October 21, at which point Bualoi became a Category 2-equivalent typhoon on the Saffir-Simpson hurricane wind scale. The system then recommenced its rapid intensification, strengthening to Category 3 six hours later, and proceeded to steadily intensify further to Category 4 later the same day. The system began to rapidly weaken the following day, dropping to a category 3-equivalent typhoon.

Severe Tropical Storm Matmo

A tropical depression formed near Palau on October 28 and made landfall in Vietnam on October 30 as it intensified to a tropical storm and was named "Matmo". The storm brought rainfall to Cambodia and Thailand, while the heaviest rainfall occurred in Vietnam, causing flooding and road closures. The storm quickly weakened to tropical depression status and dissipated, with its remnants later emerging into the North Indian Ocean on November 2. The remnants soon redeveloped into a depression on November 5, which later became Cyclone Bulbul.

Typhoon Halong

 On November 6, Halong began to undergo an eyewall replacement cycle and decreasing sea surface temperatures coupled with dry air intrusion began to take its toll on the system, and its circulation was heavily affected and it weakened to a Category 4-equivalent typhoon on 18:00 UTC.

Typhoon Nakri (Quiel)

In Luzon, the combined effects of Nakri and a cold front produced widespread heavy rain. The resulting floods and landslides killed 24 people and left 13 others missing. Cagayan Province alone suffered ₱1.8 billion (US$49.4 million) in damage.

Typhoon Fengshen

Typhoon Kalmaegi (Ramon)

 Up until November 16, Ramon appeared very disorganised as its low-level circulation center was exposed to high amounts of wind shear and dry air intrusion restricted any strengthening. 

Across Cagayan Province, the storm caused ₱618.7 million (US$12.4 million) in damage.

Severe Tropical Storm Fung-wong (Sarah)

Typhoon Kammuri (Tisoy)

 Upwelling of itself due to its quasi-stationary movement combined with moderate wind shear hindered significant intensification of Kammuri over the next three days as it moved into the Philippine Area of Responsibility, with PAGASA subsequently assigning the typhoon the name Tisoy. Kammuri began to show signs of rapid intensification again on December 1, ultimately intensifying to a Category 4 typhoon the next day. It made landfall at peak intensity on that day in the Bicol Region and began to weaken, weakening to a Category 3 typhoon that evening.

As of January 22, 2020, 17 people have been found dead while 318 were injured. Estimated damages across the central Philippines have been at Php6.65 billion (US$130 million), according from the NDRRMC.

Both International and local names are retired. Kammuri was retired and replaced with Koto. The name Tisoy was also retired and replaced with Tamaraw for the 2023 season.

Typhoon Phanfone (Ursula)

 The system proceeded to move into the Philippine Area of Responsibility on December 23, 5:00 am PST, and was named Ursula by the PAGASA. On the same day, the JTWC finally upgraded the system to a tropical storm. Owing to favorable conditions, Phanfone intensified into a severe tropical storm on December 23, and further intensified into a Category 2 typhoon shortly before making landfall near Salcedo in Eastern Samar, causing drastic flooding and mudslides in the region weeks after Typhoon Kammuri

The name Phanfone was also retired, replaced with Nokaen.

Other systems

Many of the tropical depressions of the season failed to intensify into tropical storms, or even be numbered.

During May 7, the JMA reported that two tropical depressions had developed over the basin. The first was located to the south of Palau and remained near stationary, before it was last noted during the next day. The second system developed near the Federal States of Micronesia and slowly moved westwards over the next few days before it was last noted as tropical depression during May 11. During May 10, a third tropical depression developed to the south of Palau.

Storm names
 
Within the Northwest Pacific Ocean, both the Japan Meteorological Agency (JMA) and the Philippine Atmospheric, Geophysical and Astronomical Services Administration (PAGASA) assign names to tropical cyclones that develop in the Western Pacific, which can result in a tropical cyclone having two names. PAGASA names to tropical cyclones which move into or form as a tropical depression in their area of responsibility located between 135°E and 115°E and between 5°N and 25°N even if the cyclone has had an international name assigned to it. The names of significant tropical cyclones are retired, by both PAGASA and the Typhoon Committee. Should the list of names for the Philippine region be exhausted then names will be taken from an auxiliary list of which the first ten are published each season.

International names

The JMA selected the names from a list of 140 names, that had been developed by the 14 members nations and territories of the ESCAP/WMO Typhoon Committee. During the season, the names Mun, Bailu and Bualoi were used for the first time, after they replaced the names Fitow, Haiyan and Rammasun which were retired after the 2013 and 2014 seasons, respectively.

Retirement
After the season, the Typhoon Committee announced that the names Lekima, Faxai, Hagibis, Kammuri, and Phanfone would be removed from the naming lists. In 2021, they were replaced by Co-may, Nongfa, Ragasa, Koto, and Nokaen, respectively.

Philippines

During the season PAGASA used its own naming scheme for the 21 tropical cyclones, that either developed within or moved into their self-defined area of responsibility. The names were taken from a list of names, that had been last used during 2015 and are scheduled to be used again during 2023. The names Liwayway, Nimfa, Perla and Sarah were used for the first time after the names Lando, Nona, Pedring and Sendong were retired.

Retirement
After the season, PAGASA had announced that the names Tisoy and Ursula would be eliminated from their naming lists after these typhoons caused a combined total of  damages both in Infrastructure and Agriculture on their respective onslaught in the country. In January 2020, the PAGASA chose the names Tamaraw and Ugong to replace Tisoy and Ursula for the 2023 season.

Season effects
This table summarizes all the systems that developed within or moved into the North Pacific Ocean, to the west of the International Date Line during 2019. The tables also provide an overview of a systems intensity, duration, land areas affected and any deaths or damages associated with the system.

|-
| Pabuk ||  || bgcolor=#| || bgcolor=#| || bgcolor=#| || Natuna Islands, Vietnam, Malaysia, Thailand, Myanmar ||  ||  || 
|-
| 01W (Amang) ||  || bgcolor=#| || bgcolor=#| || bgcolor=#| || Kiribati, Marshall Islands, Caroline Islands, Philippines ||  ||  || 
|-
| Wutip (Betty) ||  || bgcolor=#| || bgcolor=#| || bgcolor=#| || Caroline Islands, Mariana Islands ||  ||  None ||
|-
| 03W (Chedeng) ||  || bgcolor=#| || bgcolor=#| || bgcolor=#| || Caroline Islands, Philippines ||  ||  None || 
|-
| TD ||  || bgcolor=#| || bgcolor=#| || bgcolor=#| || Yap, Palau || None ||  None ||
|-
| TD ||  || bgcolor=#| || bgcolor=#| || bgcolor=#| || Caroline Islands || None ||  None ||
|-
| TD ||  || bgcolor=#| || bgcolor=#| || bgcolor=#| || None || None ||  None ||
|-
| Sepat (Dodong) ||  || bgcolor=#| || bgcolor=#| || bgcolor=#| || Japan, Aleutian Islands, Russian Far East || None ||  None ||
|-
| TD ||  || bgcolor=#| || bgcolor=#| || bgcolor=#| || Japan, Korean Peninsula || None ||  None ||
|-
| 04W (Egay) ||  || bgcolor=#| || bgcolor=#| || bgcolor=#| || Yap, Philippines, Taiwan, East China || None ||  None ||
|-
| Mun ||  || bgcolor=#| || bgcolor=#| || bgcolor=#| || South China, Vietnam, Laos ||  ||  || 
|-
| Danas (Falcon) ||  || bgcolor=#| || bgcolor=#| || bgcolor=#| || Yap, Philippines, Taiwan, East China, Japan, Korean Peninsula, Russian Far East ||  ||  ||
|-
| Goring ||  || bgcolor=#| || bgcolor=#| || bgcolor=#| || Philippines, Taiwan, Ryukyu Islands || None ||  None ||
|-
| Nari ||  || bgcolor=#| || bgcolor=#| || bgcolor=#| || Japan || None ||  None ||
|-
| Wipha ||  || bgcolor=#| || bgcolor=#| || bgcolor=#| || South China, Vietnam, Laos ||  ||  || 
|-
| Francisco ||  || bgcolor=#| || bgcolor=#| || bgcolor=#| || Japan, Korean Peninsula ||  Unknown ||  || 
|-
| Lekima (Hanna) ||  || bgcolor=#| || bgcolor=#| || bgcolor=#| || Caroline Islands, Philippines, Ryukyu Islands, Taiwan, South Korea, China ||  ||  || 
|-
| Krosa ||  || bgcolor=#| || bgcolor=#| || bgcolor=#| || Mariana Islands, Japan, Korean Peninsula, Russian Far East ||  ||  ||
|-
| TD ||  || bgcolor=#| || bgcolor=#| || bgcolor=#| || Philippines || None ||  None ||
|-
| TD ||  || bgcolor=#| || bgcolor=#| || bgcolor=#| || None || None ||  None ||
|-
| TD ||  || bgcolor=#| || bgcolor=#| || bgcolor=#| || Ryukyu Islands, Taiwan, East China || None ||  None ||
|-
| Bailu (Ineng) ||  || bgcolor=#| || bgcolor=#| || bgcolor=#| || Philippines, Taiwan, South China ||  ||  ||
|-
| Podul (Jenny) ||  || bgcolor=#| || bgcolor=#| || bgcolor=#| || Yap, Philippines, Vietnam, Laos, Thailand, Cambodia ||  ||  || 
|-
| Kajiki (Kabayan) ||  || bgcolor=#| || bgcolor=#| || bgcolor=#| || Philippines, South China, Vietnam, Laos ||  ||  || 
|-
| Lingling (Liwayway) ||  || bgcolor=#| || bgcolor=#| || bgcolor=#| || Philippines, Ryukyu Islands, Korean Peninsula, Northeast China, Russian Far East ||  ||  ||
|-
| TD ||  || bgcolor=#| || bgcolor=#| || bgcolor=#| || Philippines || None ||  None ||
|-
| Faxai ||  || bgcolor=#| || bgcolor=#| || bgcolor=#| || Japan ||  ||  || 
|-
| TD ||  || bgcolor=#| || bgcolor=#| || bgcolor=#| || Caroline Islands || None ||  None ||
|-
| TD ||  || bgcolor=#| || bgcolor=#| || bgcolor=#| || Ryukyu Islands, Korean Peninsula || None ||  None ||
|-
| Marilyn ||  || bgcolor=#| || bgcolor=#| || bgcolor=#| || None || None ||  None ||
|-
| Peipah ||  || bgcolor=#| || bgcolor=#| || bgcolor=#| || Mariana Islands, Bonin Islands || None ||  None ||
|-
| TD ||  || bgcolor=#| || bgcolor=#| || bgcolor=#| || Japan || None ||  None ||
|-
| Tapah (Nimfa) ||  || bgcolor=#| || bgcolor=#| || bgcolor=#| || Taiwan, East China, Japan, South Korea ||  ||  ||
|-
| TD ||  || bgcolor=#| || bgcolor=#| || bgcolor=#| || Philippines || None ||  None ||
|-
| Mitag (Onyok) ||  || bgcolor=#| || bgcolor=#| || bgcolor=#| || Mariana Islands, Taiwan, Japan, East China, South Korea || > ||  ||
|-
| TD ||  || bgcolor=#| || bgcolor=#| || bgcolor=#| || None || None ||  None ||
|-
| Hagibis ||  || bgcolor=#| || bgcolor=#| || bgcolor=#| || Mariana Islands, Japan, South Korea, Russian Far East, Aleutian Islands, Alaska || > ||  ||
|-
| Neoguri (Perla) ||  || bgcolor=#| || bgcolor=#| || bgcolor=#| || Japan || None ||  None ||
|-
| Bualoi ||  || bgcolor=#| || bgcolor=#| || bgcolor=#| || Caroline Islands, Mariana Islands || None ||  ||
|-
| TD ||  || bgcolor=#| || bgcolor=#| || bgcolor=#| || None || None ||  None ||
|-
| Matmo ||  || bgcolor=#| || bgcolor=#| || bgcolor=#| || Philippines, Vietnam, Cambodia, Laos, Thailand ||  ||  2 || 
|-
| Halong ||  || bgcolor=#| || bgcolor=#| || bgcolor=#| || None || None ||  None ||
|-
| Nakri (Quiel) ||  || bgcolor=#| || bgcolor=#| || bgcolor=#| || Philippines, Vietnam || ||  || 
|-
| Fengshen ||  || bgcolor=#| || bgcolor=#| || bgcolor=#| || Marshall Islands, Marianas Islands || None ||  None ||
|-
| Kalmaegi (Ramon) ||  || bgcolor=#| || bgcolor=#| || bgcolor=#| || Philippines, Taiwan ||  ||  None ||
|-
| Fung-wong (Sarah) ||  || bgcolor=#| || bgcolor=#| || bgcolor=#| || Philippines, Taiwan, Ryukyu Islands || None ||  None ||
|-
| Kammuri (Tisoy) ||  || bgcolor=#| || bgcolor=#| || bgcolor=#| || Caroline Islands, Mariana Islands, Philippines ||  ||  ||
|-
| TD ||  || bgcolor=#| || bgcolor=#| || bgcolor=#| || Mariana Islands || None ||  None ||
|-
| TD ||  || bgcolor=#| || bgcolor=#| || bgcolor=#| || Caroline Islands || None ||  None ||
|-
| Phanfone (Ursula) ||  || bgcolor=#| || bgcolor=#| || bgcolor=#| || Caroline Islands, Philippines ||  ||  50 ||.
|-

See also

 Weather of 2019
 Tropical cyclones in 2019
 Pacific typhoon season
 2019 Atlantic hurricane season
 2019 Pacific hurricane season
 2019 North Indian Ocean cyclone season
 South-West Indian Ocean cyclone seasons: 2018–19, 2019–20
 Australian region cyclone seasons: 2018–19, 2019–20
 South Pacific cyclone seasons: 2018–19, 2019–20

Notes

References

External links

2019 Pacific Typhoon Season Animation

 
Pacific typhoon seasons
2019 WPac